Li Yaguang (born 8 June 1958) is a Chinese former basketball player who competed in the 1984 Summer Olympics and in the 1988 Summer Olympics.

Investigation 
On 2 February 2023, he was put under investigation for alleged "serious violations of discipline and laws" by the Central Commission for Discipline Inspection (CCDI), the party's internal disciplinary body, and the National Supervisory Commission, the highest anti-corruption agency of China.

References

1958 births
Living people
Chinese men's basketball players
1982 FIBA World Championship players
Olympic basketball players of China
Basketball players at the 1984 Summer Olympics
Basketball players at the 1988 Summer Olympics
Asian Games medalists in basketball
Basketball players at the 1982 Asian Games
Basketball players at the 1986 Asian Games
Asian Games gold medalists for China
Asian Games silver medalists for China
Medalists at the 1982 Asian Games
Medalists at the 1986 Asian Games